Osława Dąbrowa is a non-operational PKP railway station in Osława Dąbrowa (Pomeranian Voivodeship), Poland.

Lines crossing the station

References

Oslawa Dabrowa
Oslawa Dabrowa
Bytów County